"Phone Down" is a song recorded by American DJs Lost Kings and singer Emily Warren. It was released as a single on October 7, 2016, via Disruptor Records and RCA Records.

Charts

Weekly charts

Year-end charts

Certifications

References

2016 singles
2016 songs
Lost Kings songs
Disruptor Records singles
Electronic songs
Emily Warren songs
Future bass songs
Songs written by Emily Warren
Songs written by Scott Harris (songwriter)
RCA Records singles